Real Gold is a British music and arts brand established in London in Summer 2006.

Although the brand operates across various industries including recorded music, event promotion, print publishing and merchandising, Real Gold is most commonly associated with the hospitality sector, having opened The Alibi bar in Dalston, Pamela bar in Haggerston, Five Miles in Seven Sisters and more.

There is a heavy use of cataloguing with all the brand's output very similar to that of Factory Records.

History 
 
The brand was founded by Dean 'Deano Jo' Joannides. The first incarnation of Real Gold was that of a DJ collective, before evolving into a more focused event promotion organisation. Real Gold began creating merchandise that showcased various types of creative talent, which were labelled as 'Releases', most commonly taking the form of t-shirts, vinyl records and fanzines.
 
With early Real Gold associates becoming known independently in their own respective careers (see Collaborators), in 2009 the brand evolved into the working alias for Deano Jo and enveloped most of his entrepreneurial work.
 
Deano Jo was listed in The Independent's 2009 feature on 'The 15 people who will define the future of arts in Britain' and profiled in Dazed & Confuzed's article on the world's most inspiring young entrepreneurs.

Collaborators 
 
Early members and frequent collaborators include photographer Ben Rayner, creative director Ronojoy Dam, art director Ben Freeman, chef Gabriel Pryce, artist Lewis Teague Wright and many more.
 
Real Gold worked with musicians Adele, Florence and the Machine and Laura Marling at early stages in their careers.

In 2017 they commissioned and presented 'The Best of Risky Roadz' at Rio Cinema, Dalston and The Mockingbird Cinema, Birmingham.

In 2020 they presented the debut art exhibition for musician Frank Carter.

Associated Businesses and Organisations

Current

° Love Brother
° Pamela
° Sweeney
° Thug Nation
° Yeah Boi!

Previously

° The Alibi
° Birthdays
° Five Miles
° Future Artefacts
° Rita's

Releases

Events

Main Event Series

° RGEVENT
° RGCOLLAB
° RGDJ

Other Event Series

° Cough / Cool
° North Angel
° Rich History
° The Golden Gloves
° The International Amalgamation of Champions

RGEVENT

RGCOLLAB

RGDJ

References

Clothing brands
English artist groups and collectives